Daphne Island is a river island in Alberta, Canada.  It is in the Athabasca River, located north of Fort McMurray.

Daphne Island was named for Daphne Wallace, the daughter of a surveyor.

References

River islands of Canada